Eschatura lactea is a moth in the family Xyloryctidae. It was described by Turner in 1898. It is found in Australia, where it has been recorded from Queensland.

The wingspan is 22–29 mm. The forewings are uniform milky-white, without markings and with a very faint indication of pale fuscous suffusion towards the hindmargin. The hindwings are white with a very faint indication suffusion towards the apex.

The larvae feed on Carya illinoensis. They bore in the stem of their host plant.

References

Xyloryctidae
Moths described in 1898